James John Faran (December 29, 1808 – December 12, 1892) was an American lawyer and politician who served two terms as a U.S. Representative from Ohio from 1845 to 1849.

Early life and career 
Born in Cincinnati, Ohio, Faran attended the common schools, and was graduated from Miami University, Oxford, Ohio, in 1831.
He studied law.
He was admitted to the bar in 1833 and commenced practice in Cincinnati.

Political career  
Faran was elected as a Democrat a member of the State house of representatives 1835-1839 and served as speaker in 1838 and 1839.
He served in the State senate 1839–1843, and was its presiding officer 1841–1843.
He served as associate editor and proprietor of The Cincinnati Enquirer 1844–1881.

Congress 
Faran was elected as a Democrat to the Twenty-ninth and Thirtieth Congresses (March 4, 1845 – March 3, 1849).
He served as chairman of the Committee on Public Buildings and Grounds (Twenty-ninth Congress).
He was not a candidate for renomination in 1848.

Later career 
He was appointed by Governor Medill one of the commissioners to supervise the erection of the State capitol in 1854.

Mayor of Cincinnati 
He served as mayor of Cincinnati 1855–1857.
He was appointed by President Buchanan postmaster of Cincinnati June 4, 1855, and served until October 21, 1859.
He served as delegate to the 1860 Democratic National Convention at Baltimore.
He engaged in newspaper work until shortly before his death.

Death
He died in Cincinnati, Ohio, December 12, 1892.
He was interred in Spring Grove Cemetery.

Notes

Sources

1808 births
1892 deaths
Politicians from Cincinnati
Ohio lawyers
Burials at Spring Grove Cemetery
Miami University alumni
Speakers of the Ohio House of Representatives
Democratic Party Ohio state senators
19th-century American newspaper publishers (people)
Democratic Party members of the United States House of Representatives from Ohio
19th-century American journalists
American male journalists
19th-century American male writers
19th-century American politicians
The Cincinnati Enquirer people
Democratic Party members of the Ohio House of Representatives
19th-century American lawyers